Pavle Cukić (Serbian: Павле Цукић; 1778 - 1817) was a Serbian duke and a revolutionary from the time of the First Serbian Uprising and Second Serbian Uprising.

Biography
Pavle Cukić was a native of Krčmar, the Lepenica principality of the Kragujevac nahija. In 1812, by the decision of the Governing Council, Cukić was removed from the position of a duke, due to abuses in the performance of his duties. He decided to desert, and a state arrest warrant was issued along with a death sentence. After he voluntarily surrendered, he received a pardon, but no sooner he got into a disagreement with the newly appointed duke of the same principality, Miloš Saranovac.

After a misunderstanding and rebellion against Prince Miloš, Duke Pavle Cukić was killed in Rogača near Sopot, where he was buried. Miloš's wrath had no bounds he dealt ruthlessly with disobedient subordinates and executed the most famous revolutionary no matter who they were, including Karađorđe, Petar Nikolajević Moler, Sima Marković, Bishop Melentije Simeonović Nikšić of Šabac. There were many revolts directed against Miloš's autocratic rule.

The tombstone of Duke Pavle Cukić was established as a cultural monument in 1987 (SK 229, CR 808), while it was completely renovated in 2006.

Duke Pavle Cukić was married twice. That is, Cukić had two wives, one who was in exile in Srem and the other in the interior of Serbia. Later, both wives lived in his house together even after his death. From his first marriage, he had a daughter, Persida, whose grandson is Radoje Domanović, a writer. Pavle Cukić had no sons from his legal wives. Duke Pavle Cukić had an illegitimate son when he adopted Petar Lazarević Cukić, who, together with Ana, the daughter of Duke Petar Nikolajević Moler, had a son, Kosta Cukić, the Minister of Finance. Another woman, the widow of Duke Pavle Cukić, in her second marriage to Captain Stevan Piroćanac, had a son, Milan Piroćanac, a statesman, the president of the 31st government of Serbia.

Legacy
The tombstone of Vojvoda Pavle Cukić from 1817 is located on the left side of the road leading from the centre of the village to the so-called “Albanian area”. The memorial is made in tough greenish sandstone, frequently used for tombstones in the area of greater Belgrade.

By its form and treatment, it is a typical gravestone from the area of Belgrade during the past two centuries. The memorial placed at the head of the grave is an elongated parallelepiped with a curved top and a protrusion in the middle along the whole width of the stone block. There are no inscriptions on the monument or the tablet and the decoration is only on the face side: a carved and low relief stylized human figure, also typical of the time and the area. The well-trimmed horizontal tablet has no ornaments. A carved line that followed the edges can still be perceived in some places on the upper side.

Sources
 Milan Đ. Milićević, Pomenik znamenitih ljudi u srpskog narodu novijega doba, Vol 1 (Belgrade, 1888)
 Milan Đ. Milićević,Kneževina Srbija (Belgrade, 1878)
 Lazar Arsenijević Batalaka, Istorija srpskog ustanka (Belgrade, 1898)
 Konstantin N. Nenadović, Život i dela velikog Đorđa Petrovića Kara Đorđa Vrhovnog Vožda... (Vienna, 1884)

See also
 List of Serbian Revolutionaries

References 

Dukes in Serbia
1778 births
1817 deaths